Emmett Francis Mortell (April 8, 1916 – January 12, 2000) was an American football tailback in the National Football League for the Philadelphia Eagles from 1937 to 1939. He played at the collegiate level at the University of Notre Dame and the University of Wisconsin–Madison.

See also
List of Philadelphia Eagles players

References

1916 births
2000 deaths
Philadelphia Eagles players
Sportspeople from Appleton, Wisconsin
Players of American football from Wisconsin
Wisconsin Badgers football players
Wilmington Clippers players